The 777th Aviation Support Battalion (777th ASB) is a US Army National Guard battalion. It was stationed at Balad Air Base in Balad, Iraq during Operation Iraqi Freedom. The current challenge coin issued was designed by Ret. Sergeant Joseph M. Traylor.

Structure

 Headquarters Support Company (AR ARNG)

References

AVN 777